Robin H. S. Boyd (14 May 1924 – 14 June 2018) was an Irish theologian and missionary to India, ordained in the Irish Presbyterian Church. He also worked with the Student Christian Movement and was a presbyter in the Church of North India.

Biography 
Boyd was born in Belfast in 1924, to Irish missionaries to India. He pursued undergraduate studies in classics at Trinity College Dublin, which was interrupted from 1943 to 1945 for war service, and went on for theological studies at New College, Edinburgh. He worked for two years with the Student Christian Movement as secretary to theological colleges (1951–1953), studied briefly in Basel with Karl Barth and Oscar Cullmann, before marrying his first wife and SCM colleague Frances Paton (granddaughter of John Gibson Paton) and moving to India as Christian missionaries in 1954. In 1959, Boyd returned to Edinburgh to begin his PhD on the subject "The Place of Dogmatic Theology in the Indian Church."

He was appointed to the Gujarat United School of Theology in Ahmedabad in 1961 and witnessed the formation of the Church of North India in 1970. In 1974, after twenty years as a missionary in India, Boyd took up the parish ministry in Melbourne and witnessed the formation of another church union, the Uniting Church in Australia in 1977. He later served as director of the Irish School of Ecumenics (1980–1987) before returning to Melbourne for parish ministry and retiring in 1994. His wife Frances died in 1998 and, after a brief visit to Scotland, he married Anne Booth-Clibborn (née Forrester) a former Church of Scotland social worker in Kenya.

Boyd died on 14 June 2018 in Edinburgh.

Indian Christian theology 

Boyd is best known for his writings in Indian Christian theology. His PhD thesis was published in 1969 as An Introduction to Indian Christian Theology, and revised and expanded in 1975. In India, this work is described as the "standard textbook at the B.Th. and B.D. levels for the course in Indian Christian theology."

Works

References 

1924 births
2018 deaths
Irish Calvinist and Reformed theologians
Presbyterian missionaries in India
World Christianity scholars
Irish expatriates in India
People from Belfast
Alumni of the University of Edinburgh School of Divinity